Grit Šadeiko (born 29 July 1989) is an Estonian heptathlete. She won the heptathlon at the 2011 European Athletics U23 Championships.

Personal life
Šadeiko's younger sister Grete is also a heptathlete.

Major competition record

References

External links

 

1989 births
Living people
People from Saku Parish
Estonian heptathletes
Athletes (track and field) at the 2012 Summer Olympics
Athletes (track and field) at the 2016 Summer Olympics
Olympic athletes of Estonia
Estonian sportswomen
World Athletics Championships athletes for Estonia